Hub River is located in Hub District, Balochistan, Pakistan. It starts from the Pab Range in the south eastern Balochistan and continues along the border of Sindh and reaches Hub and then falls into the Arabian Sea.
"Hab river emerges from mountains near Zahri village of Jhalawan, and it flows along the border of Sindh and Lasbela for 60 miles and it ends at Arabian Sea near Ras Monzi. Greek historians named it as Aarabes,  its eastern side was called Arabti and the area of western side of its bank as Orieti. After the month of September the water level of the river remains up to 8 inches. Its banks are at  considerable height covered by greenery. Rainy branches Sarona, Samutri and Veera carry rainy water into it. The fish of Hub are tasty". The total length of hub river is 134 km

History
Alexander the Great crossed Hub River through Lasbela on his way back to Babylon after conquering Northwestern India. Alexander mentions the river name as Arabius, and local people as Oreitans. In 711 CE, the Arab general Muhammad bin Qasim crossed Hub River when he passed through Lasbela on his way to Sindh.

See also
 Oreitans
 Hub District
 Hub Tehsil
 Hub River
 Hub Dam
 Hub, Balochistan
 Hub Industrial & Trading Estate

References 

Rivers of Sindh
Rivers of Balochistan (Pakistan)
Rivers of Karachi
Rivers of Pakistan